Rocky Mills, built c. 1750, was a Georgian mansion in Hanover County, Virginia. Disassembled and relocated about 21 miles to Henrico County, Virginia in 1928, it was reassembled and expanded by architect H. Louis Duhring, Jr.

The woodwork and paneling of its rooms is particularly fine.

Now renamed "Fairfield," the property, including four contributing buildings, was listed on the National Register of Historic Places in 2002.

Fairfield Estate is currently listed for sale, to view more information about the property check out this link!

References

Further reading
  Rocky Mills Mansion, 211 Ross Road (moved from Ashland vicinity, VA), Richmond, Independent City, VA at the Historic American Buildings Survey (HABS)

Houses on the National Register of Historic Places in Virginia
Colonial Revival architecture in Virginia
Houses completed in 1750
Houses completed in 1928
Houses in Hanover County, Virginia
Houses in Henrico County, Virginia
National Register of Historic Places in Henrico County, Virginia
Relocated buildings and structures in Virginia
Historic American Buildings Survey in Virginia